Chiang Hsiao-chang (born 1938) is the only daughter of Chiang Ching-kuo, the President of the Republic of China in Taiwan from 1978 to 1988.  Her mother was Chiang Fang-liang.  She had one older brother, Hsiao-wen, and two younger brothers, Hsiao-wu and Hsiao-yung. She is the only living member of Chiang Ching-kuo's legitimate children, and was the only one among the siblings who could converse in Russian with their mother.
She also has twin half-brothers,  Winston Chang and John Chiang, with whom she shares the same father. She attended Mills College and was featured in LIFE during her college years. She was married to Yu Yang-ho until his death in 2010; he was the son of former Taiwan defense minister Yu Ta-wei. She and Yu have one son, Theodore Yu Tsu-sheng.

References

1936 births
Living people
Chiang Kai-shek family
Taiwanese people of Belarusian descent
People from Ganzhou
Taiwanese people from Jiangxi